Phat Joe is a South African TV and radio personality. He is the host of a late night show, The Phat Joe Show.

He was also host of the first season of the gossip show The Real Goboza, and the dating shows Take Me Out: South Africa, on SABC1 in 2014, and Take Me Out: Mzansi, on Vuzu Amp in 2017.
 He also presented the second season of The Real Housewives of Johannesburg. He will host upcoming television show Temptation Island starting  on August 26, 2021.

Filmography

Television

Awards and nominations

References

External links
 

1974 births
Living people
People from Pretoria